Renate (minor planet designation: 575 Renate) is a minor planet orbiting the Sun which was discovered by German astronomer Max Wolf on September 19, 1905. The name may have been inspired by the asteroid's provisional designation 1905 RE.

Photometric observations at the Palmer Divide Observatory in Colorado Springs, Colorado in 1999 were used to build a light curve for this object. The asteroid displayed a rotation period of 3.676 ± 0.002 hours and a brightness variation of 0.15 ± 0.01 in magnitude.

This is a member of the dynamic Maria family of asteroids that most likely formed as the result of a collisional breakup of a parent body.

References

External links 
 Lightcurve plot of 575 Renate, Palmer Divide Observatory, B. D. Warner (1999)
 Discovery Circumstances: Numbered Minor Planets (1)-(5000) – Minor Planet Center
 
 

Maria asteroids
Renate
Renate
19050919